Ken Goodwin (born March 2, 1961, in Provost, Alberta) is a former field hockey goalkeeper from Canada, who participated in two consequentive Summer Olympics for his native country, starting in 1984. After having finished in tenth position in Los Angeles, California, Goodwin ended up in eleventh place in the Seoul Games with the Men's National Team.  Ken was inducted into the Alberta Sports Hall of Fame in 2008.

International senior competitions

 1984 – Olympic Games, Los Angeles (10th)
 1988 – Olympic Games, Seoul (11th)

References
 Canadian Olympic Committee
 Alberta Sports Hall of Fame

External links
 
 
 
 

1961 births
Living people
Canadian male field hockey players
Olympic field hockey players of Canada
Field hockey players at the 1984 Summer Olympics
Field hockey players at the 1988 Summer Olympics
Pan American Games gold medalists for Canada
Pan American Games silver medalists for Canada
Field hockey players at the 1987 Pan American Games
Field hockey players at the 1991 Pan American Games
Canadian people of British descent
People from the Municipal District of Provost No. 52
Sportspeople from Alberta
Pan American Games medalists in field hockey
Medalists at the 1987 Pan American Games
Medalists at the 1991 Pan American Games